
Gmina Mielno is an urban-rural gmina (administrative district) in Koszalin County, West Pomeranian Voivodeship, in north-western Poland. Its seat is the village of Mielno, a resort on the Baltic Sea coast.

Villages
Gmina Mielno contains the villages and settlements of Barnowo, Chłopy, Czajcze, Gąski, Komorniki, Łazy, Mielenko, Mielenko-Kolonia, Mielno, Niegoszcz, Paprotno, Pękalin, Radzichowo, Sarbinowo and Unieście.

Neighbouring gminas
Gmina Mielno is bordered by the gminas of Będzino, Darłowo and Sianów.

References
Polish official population figures 2006

Mielno
Koszalin County